Sigma Investments Group (known as Sigma Investments Limited) is a multinational company founded by Iman Mutlaq based in Amman, Jordan. It offers diversified investment opportunities and advisory services to clients.

Affiliation 
Sigma Investments is the sole agent of Australia-based INGOT Brokers in the Middle East; Ingot Brokers, a portal which enables trading on global currencies and precious metals, and also facilitates clients on reaching foreign exchange markets. It is a member of Global Alliance Partners (GAP).

Egyptian Commodities Exchange 
Sigma investments and Ingot are members of the three member consortium which signed cooperation protocol with Egyptian government to establish a US$35–50m worth electronic Egyptian Commodities Exchange in Egypt as the first ever country in the MENA region; it will facilitate the well-being of the small farmers and supply of products at reasonable prices abolishing the monopoly of goods.

References

External links 
 

Investment companies of Jordan
Companies based in Amman
Financial services companies of Bahrain
Financial services companies of Jordan
Holding companies established in 2004